Sierra Leone Ministry of Defence and National Security is a Sierra Leonean government department in charge of implementing  and supervising  the Sierra Leone Armed Forces and the territorial security of Sierra Leone's international border and defending the national interests of Sierra Leone.

Location 
The Ministry of Defence and National Security building is located in State Avenue at Tower Hill in central Freetown, a few distance from the State House.

Mission
Mission Statement
The mission of the Ministry is to formulate, implement, monitor and evaluate strategic defence policy for the Republic of Sierra Leone Armed Forces (RSLAF) that is effective and fostered within a framework of democratic governance.

Objectives
To formulate and implement strategic defence policy; 
To develop and maintain a re-structured and robust RSLAF that is well trained, well disciplined and well cared for; 
To equip and provide logistics support to the RSLAF; 
To transform the RSLAF into an organization that is accountable, incorruptible and subject to democratic control; 
To continually evolve and improve the RSLAF; 
To deliver the endorsed Defence Missions and Military Tasks.

Minister of Defence 
The department is headed by the Minister of Defence and National Security, who must be a civilian, and is appointed by the President of Sierra Leone and must be confirmed by the Parliament of Sierra Leone in order to take office.

The current Minister of Defence and National Security is a retired Brig Gen Kellie Hassan Conteh, who was appointed by President Julius Maada Bio in October 2020. The Sierra Leone Minister of Defence is one of the most important, government agencies in the country and the position is usually held by a retired Sierra Leonean military officer.

Like all government ministries in the country, the Minister of Defence can be dismissed by the president of Sierra Leone at any time. During the Sierra Leone civil war, Sierra Leone's president Ahmad Tejan Kabbah appointed himself Minister of Defence and National Security, which is legal.

List of ministers

References

External links
 Official website

Ministerial departments of the Sierra Leone Government
Military of Sierra Leone
1894 establishments in Sierra Leone